Jazz Casual: Paul Winter/Bola Sete and Vince Guaraldi is a live performance album featuring performances by saxophonist Paul Winter, guitarist Bola Sete and pianist Vince Guaraldi, released in 2001 by Koch Jazz. The release contains two separate episodes of the National Educational Television Jazz Casual television show that aired in March and September of 1963.

Track listing

Personnel 
Credits adapted from CD liner notes.
 Bola Sete – guitar
Paul Winter Sextet
 Paul Winter – alto saxophone
 Jay Cameron – baritone saxophone
 Richard Whitsell – trumpet
 Warren Bernhardt – piano
 Arthur Harper, Jr. – bass
 Ben Riley – drums
Vince Guaraldi Trio
 Vince Guaraldi – piano
 Fred Marshall – double bass
 Jerry Granelli – drums
Additional
 Ralph J. Gleason – host, producer
 Toby Gleason – liner notes
 Peter Keepnews – liner notes

References

External links 
 Jazz Casual: Paul Winter/Bola Sete and Vince Guaraldi at Discogs

2001 live albums
Collaborative albums
Vince Guaraldi albums
Vince Guaraldi live albums
Bola Sete live albums
Paul Winter albums